Dramatic Prakrits were those standard forms of Prakrit dialects that were used in dramas and other literature in medieval India. They may have once been spoken languages or were based on spoken languages, but continued to be used as literary languages long after they ceased to be spoken. Dramatic Prakrits are important for the study of the development of Indo-Aryan languages, because their usage in plays and literature is always accompanied by a translation in Sanskrit.

Dialects
The phrase "Dramatic Prakrits" often refers to the three most prominent of them, Shauraseni, Magadhi and Maharashtri Prakrit.  However, there were a slew of other less commonly used Prakrits that also fall into this category.  These include Prācya, Bahliki, Dakshinatya (spoken in modern day states of Karnataka, Andhra Pradesh, Telangana and Maharashtra) , Sakari, Candali, Sabari, Abhiri, Dramili Prakrit, and Odri.  There was an astoundingly strict structure to the use of these different Prakrits in dramas.  Characters each spoke a different Prakrit based on their role and background; for example, Dramili was the language of "forest-dwellers", Shauraseni was spoken by "the heroine and her female friends", and Avanti was spoken by "cheats  and rogues". The prakrits varied in intelligibility with Shauraseni being most similar to classical Sanskrit while Magadhi Prakrit being most similar to classical Pali.

Maharashtri is a particularly interesting case.  Maharashtri was often used for poetry and as such, diverged from proper Sanskrit grammar mainly to fit the language to the meter of different styles of poetry. The new grammar stuck, which leads to the unique flexibility of vowels lengths, amongst other anomalies, in Marathi.

The three principal Dramatic Prakrits and some of their descendant languages:

 Shauraseni
 Shauraseni was used in north-central India, later evolving into the Hindi languages, viz. the varieties of Hindi, the Central Zone of modern Indic, including Hindustani and Punjabi.

 Magadhi
 Magadhi was used in eastern India, later evolving into the Eastern Indo-Aryan languages, including Bengali, Assamese, Odia, and the Bihari languages (Bhojpuri, Magahi, Maithili), among others.
 Ardhamāgadhī.

 Āvantī, Prācyā, Bāhlīkā, Dākṣiṇātyā are other dialects not known to us today.

References
Woolner, Alfred C. Introduction to Prakrit. Delhi: Motilal Banarsidass, India, 1999.
Banerjee, Satya Ranjan. The Eastern School of Prakrit Grammarians : a linguistic study. Calcutta: Vidyasagar Pustak Mandir, 1977.

Notes

See also
Apabhraṃśa
Pali

Indo-Aryan languages
Theatre in India